Tetraulacium is a genus of flowering plants belonging to the family Plantaginaceae.

Its native range is Brazil.

Species:

Tetraulacium veroniciforme

References

Plantaginaceae
Plantaginaceae genera